A natural disaster is "the negative impact following an actual occurrence of natural hazard in the event that it significantly harms a community". A natural disaster can cause loss of life or damage property, and typically leaves some economic damage in its wake. The severity of the damage depends on the affected population's resilience and on the infrastructure available. Examples of natural hazards include: avalanche, coastal flooding, cold wave, drought, earthquake, hail, heat wave, hurricane (tropical cyclone), ice storm, landslide, lightning, riverine flooding, strong wind, tornado, typhoon, tsunami, volcanic activity, wildfire, winter weather. 

In modern times, the divide between natural, man-made and man-accelerated disasters is quite difficult to draw. Human choices and activities like architecture, fire, resource management and climate change potentially play a role in causing "natural disasters". In fact, the term "natural disaster" has been called a misnomer already in 1976. A disaster is a result of a natural or man-made hazard impacting a vulnerable community. It is the combination of the hazard along with exposure of a vulnerable society that results in a disaster. 

Natural disasters can be aggravated by inadequate building norms, marginalization of people, inequities, overexploitation of resources, extreme urban sprawl and climate change. The rapid growth of the world's population and its increased concentration often in hazardous environments has escalated both the frequency and severity of disasters. Extreme climates (such as those in the Tropics) and unstable landforms, coupled with deforestation, unplanned growth proliferation and non-engineered constructions  create more vulnerable interfaces of populated areas with disaster-prone natural spaces. Developing countries which suffer from chronic natural disasters, often have ineffective communication systems combined with insufficient support for disaster prevention and management.

An adverse event will not rise to the level of a disaster if it occurs in an area without a vulnerable population. Once a vulnerable population has experienced a disaster, the community can take many years to repair and that repair period can lead to further vulnerability. The disastrous consequences of natural disaster also affect the mental health of affected communities, often leading to post-traumatic symptoms. These increased emotional experiences can be supported through collective processing, leading to resilience and increased community engagement.

Terminology 
The term "disaster" is defined as follows: 

The term "natural disaster" has been called a misnomer already in 1976. Many disasters result from the combination of natural hazards and social and human vulnerability, often involving development activities that ignore or fail to reduce the disaster risks. Nature alone is blamed for disasters even when disasters result from failures in development such as inadequate building norms, marginalization of people, inequities, overexploitation of resources, extreme urban sprawl and climate change. The implications of defining disasters as solely natural events are serious when it comes to understanding the causes of a disaster and the distribution of political and financial responsibility in disaster risk reduction, disaster management, compensation, insurance and disaster prevention.

Related terms

Natural hazard 

There are 18 natural hazards included in the National Risk Index of FEMA: avalanche, coastal flooding, cold wave, drought, earthquake, hail, heat wave, hurricane (tropical cyclone), ice storm, landslide, lightning, riverine flooding, strong wind, tornado, tsunami, volcanic activity, wildfire, winter weather. In addition there are also tornados and dust storms. Several of these have a higher risk of occurring now due to the effects of climate change.

Scale 

Between 1995 and 2015, according to the UN's disaster-monitoring system, the greatest number of natural disasters occurred in America, China and India.

In 2012, there were 905 natural disasters worldwide, 93% of which were weather-related disasters. Overall costs were US$170 billion and insured losses $70 billion. 2012 was a moderate year. 45% were meteorological (storms), 36% were hydrological (floods), 12% were climatological (heat waves, cold waves, droughts, wildfires) and 7% were geophysical events (earthquakes and volcanic eruptions). Between 1980 and 2011 geophysical events accounted for 14% of all natural catastrophes.

According to 2019 WHO report countries with the highest share of disability-adjusted life years (DALY) lost due to natural disasters are Bahamas, Haiti, Zimbabwe and Armenia (probably mainly due to Spitak Earthquake).

According to the UN, Asia-Pacific is the world's most disaster prone region. According to ReliefWeb, a person in Asia-Pacific is five times more likely to be hit by a natural disaster than someone living in other regions.

Impacts 
A natural disaster may cause loss of life, injury or other health impacts, property damage, loss of livelihoods and services, social and economic disruption, or environmental damage. 

Various phenomena like earthquakes, landslides, volcanic eruptions, floods, hurricanes, tornadoes, blizzards, tsunamis, cyclones, wildfires, and pandemics are all natural hazards that kill thousands of people and destroy billions of dollars of habitat and property each year. However, the rapid growth of the world's population and its increased concentration often in hazardous environments has escalated both the frequency and severity of disasters. With the tropical climate and unstable landforms, coupled with deforestation, unplanned growth proliferation, non-engineered constructions make the disaster-prone areas more vulnerable. Developing countries suffer more or less chronically from natural disasters due to ineffective communication combined with insufficient budgetary allocation for disaster prevention and management.

On the environment 
During emergencies such as natural disasters and armed conflicts more waste may be produced, while waste management is given low priority compared with other services. Existing waste management services and infrastructures can be disrupted, leaving communities with unmanaged waste and increased littering. Under these circumstances human health and the environment are often negatively impacted.

Natural disasters (e.g. earthquakes, tsunamis, hurricanes) have the potential to generate a significant amount of waste within a short period. Waste management systems can be out of action or curtailed, often requiring considerable time and funding to restore. For example, the tsunami in Japan in 2011 produced huge amounts of debris: estimates of 5 million tonnes of waste were reported by the Japanese Ministry of the Environment. Some of this waste, mostly plastic and styrofoam washed up on the coasts of Canada and the United States in late 2011. Along the west coast of the United States, this increased the amount of litter by a factor of 10 and may have transported alien species. Storms are also important generators of plastic litter. A study by Lo et al. (2020) reported a 100% increase in the amount of microplastics on beaches surveyed following a typhoon in Hong Kong in 2018.

A significant amount of plastic waste can be produced during disaster relief operations. Following the 2010 earthquake in Haiti, the generation of waste from relief operations was referred to as a “second disaster”. The United States military reported that millions of water bottles and styrofoam food packages were distributed although there was no operational waste management system. Over 700,000 plastic tarpaulins and 100,000 tents were required for emergency shelters. The increase in plastic waste, combined with poor disposal practices, resulted in open drainage channels being blocked, increasing the risk of disease.

Conflicts can result in large-scale displacement of communities. People living under these conditions are often provided with minimal waste management facilities. Burn pits are widely used to dispose of mixed wastes, including plastics. Air pollution can lead to respiratory and other illnesses. For example, Sahrawi refugees have been living in five camps near Tindouf, Algeria for nearly 45 years. As waste collection services are underfunded and there is no recycling facility, plastics have flooded the camps’ streets and surroundings. In contrast, the Azraq camp in Jordan for refugees from Syria has waste management services; of 20.7 tonnes of waste produced per day, 15% is recyclable.

On vulnerable groups

Women 
Because of the social, political and cultural context of many places throughout the world, women are often disproportionately affected by disaster. In the 2004 Indian Ocean tsunami, more women died than men, partly due to the fact that fewer women knew how to swim. During and after a natural disaster, women are at increased risk of being affected by gender based violence and are increasingly vulnerable to sexual violence. Disrupted police enforcement, lax regulations, and displacement all contribute to increased risk of gender based violence and sexual assault. Women who have been affected by sexual violence are at a significantly increased risk of sexually transmitted infections, unique physical injuries and long term psychological consequences. All of these long-term health outcomes can prevent successful reintegration into society after the disaster recovery period.

In addition to LGBT people and immigrants, women are also disproportionately victimised by religion-based scapegoating for natural disasters: fanatical religious leaders or adherents may claim that a god or gods are angry with women's independent, freethinking behaviour, such as dressing 'immodestly', having sex or abortions. For example, Hindutva party Hindu Makkal Katchi and others blamed women's struggle for the right to enter the Sabarimala temple for the August 2018 Kerala floods, purportedly inflicted by the angry god Ayyappan. In response to Iranian Islamic cleric Kazem Seddiqi's accusation of women dressing immodestly and spreading promiscuity being the cause of earthquakes, American student Jennifer McCreight organised the Boobquake event on 26 April 2010: she encouraged women around the world to participate in dressing immodestly all at the same time while performing regular seismographic checks to prove that such behaviour in women causes no significant increase in earthquake activity.

During and after natural disasters, routine health behaviors become interrupted. In addition, health care systems may have broken down as a result of the disaster, further reducing access to contraceptives. Unprotected intercourse during this time can lead to increased rates of childbirth, unintended pregnancies and sexually transmitted infections (STIs). Methods used to prevent STIs (such as condom use) are often forgotten or not accessible during times surrounding a disaster. Lack of health care infrastructure and medical shortages hinder the ability to treat individuals once they acquire an STI. In addition, health efforts to prevent, monitor or treat HIV/AIDS are often disrupted, leading to increased rates of HIV complications and increased transmission of the virus through the population.

Pregnant women are one of the groups disproportionately affected by natural disasters. Inadequate nutrition, little access to clean water, lack of health-care services and psychological stress in the aftermath of the disaster can lead to a significant increase in maternal morbidity and mortality. Furthermore, shortage of healthcare resources during this time can convert even routine obstetric complications into emergencies. During and after a disaster, women's prenatal, peri-natal and postpartum care can become disrupted. Among women affected by natural disaster, there are significantly higher rates of low birth weight infants, preterm infants and infants with low head circumference.

On governments and voting processes 

Disasters stress government capacity, as the government tries to conduct routine as well as emergency operations. Some theorists of voting behavior propose that citizens update information about government effectiveness based on their response to disasters, which affects their vote choice in the next election.  Indeed, some evidence, based on data from the USA, reveals that incumbent parties can lose votes if citizens perceives them as responsible for a poor disaster response or gain votes based on perceptions of well-executed relief work. The latter study also finds, however, that voters do not reward incumbent parties for disaster preparedness, which may end up affecting government incentives to invest in such preparedness. Other evidence, however, also based on the USA, finds that citizens can simply backlash and blame the incumbent for hardship following a natural disaster, causing the incumbent party to lose votes. One study in India finds that incumbent parties extend more relief following disasters in areas where there is higher newspaper coverage, electoral turnout, and literacy --- the authors reason that these results indicate that incumbent parties are more responsive with relief to areas with more politically-informed citizens who would be more likely to punish them for poor relief efforts.

Violent conflicts within states can exacerbate the impact of natural disasters by weakening the ability of states, communities and individuals to provide disaster relief. Natural disasters can also worsen ongoing conflicts within states by weakening the capacity of states to fight rebels.

In Chinese and Japanese history, it has been routine for era names or capital cities and palaces of emperors to be changed after a major natural disaster, chiefly for political reasons such as association with hardships by the populace and fear of upheaval (i.e. in East Asian government chronicles, such fears were recorded in a low profile way as an unlucky name or place requiring change).

Responses

Disaster risk reduction

International campaigns 
In 2000, the United Nations launched the International Early Warning Programme to address the underlying causes of vulnerability and to build disaster-resilient communities by promoting increased awareness of the importance of disaster risk reduction as an integral component of sustainable development, with the goal of reducing human, economic and environmental losses due to hazards of all kinds.

The International Day for Disaster Reduction (IDDR) is an international day that encourages every citizen and government to take part in building more disaster-resilient communities and nations. The United Nations General Assembly designated October 13 as the International Day for Natural Disaster Reduction as part of its proclamation of the International Decade for Natural Disaster Reduction. In 2009, the UN General Assembly decided to designate October 13 as the official date for this day, and also changed the name to International Day for Disaster Reduction.

International law 

The United Nations Office for the Coordination of Humanitarian Affairs was formed by General Assembly Resolution 44/182.

Under the Convention on the Rights of Persons with Disabilities, "States Parties shall take, in accordance with their obligations under international law, including international humanitarian law and international human rights law, all necessary measures to ensure the protection and safety of persons with disabilities in situations of risk, including situations of armed conflict, humanitarian emergencies and the occurrence of natural disasters." The 1998 UN Guiding Principles on Internal Displacement and 2009 Kampala Convention also protect people displaced due to natural disasters.

Disasters caused by geological hazards

Landslides

Avalanches

Earthquakes

An earthquake is the result of a sudden release of energy in the Earth's crust that creates seismic waves. At the Earth's surface, earthquakes manifest themselves by vibration, shaking, and sometimes displacement of the ground. Earthquakes are caused by slippage within geological faults. The underground point of origin of the earthquake is called the seismic focus. The point directly above the focus on the surface is called the epicenter. Earthquakes by themselves rarely kill people or wildlife — it is usually the secondary events that they trigger, such as building collapse, fires, tsunamis and volcanic eruptions, that cause death. Many of these can possibly be avoided by better construction, safety systems, early warning and planning.

Sinkholes

When natural erosion, human mining or underground excavation makes the ground too weak to support the structures built on it, the ground can collapse and produce a sinkhole. For example, the 2010 Guatemala City sinkhole, which killed fifteen people, was caused when heavy rain from Tropical Storm Agatha, diverted by leaking pipes into a pumice bedrock, led to the sudden collapse of the ground beneath a factory building.

Volcanic eruptions

Volcanoes can cause widespread destruction and consequent disaster in several ways. One hazard is the volcanic eruption itself, with the force of the explosion and falling rocks able to cause harm. Lava may also be released during the eruption of a volcano; as it leaves the volcano, it can destroy buildings, plants and animals due to its extreme heat. In addition, volcanic ash may form a cloud (generally after cooling) and settle thickly in nearby locations. When mixed with water, this forms a concrete-like material. In sufficient quantities, ash may cause roofs to collapse under its weight. Even small quantities will harm humans if inhaled — it has the consistency of ground glass and therefore causes laceration to the throat and lungs. Volcanic ash can also cause abrasion damage to moving machinery such as engines. The main killer of humans in the immediate surroundings of a volcanic eruption is pyroclastic flows, consisting of a cloud of hot ash which builds up in the air above the volcano and rushes down the slopes when the eruption no longer supports the lifting of the gases. It is believed that Pompeii was destroyed by a pyroclastic flow. A lahar is a volcanic mudflow or landslide. The 1953 Tangiwai disaster was caused by a lahar, as was the 1985 Armero tragedy in which the town of Armero was buried and an estimated 23,000 people were killed.

Volcanoes rated at 8 (the highest level) on the Volcanic Explosivity Index are known as supervolcanoes. According to the Toba catastrophe theory, 75,000 to 80,000 years ago, a supervolcanic eruption at what is now Lake Toba in Sumatra reduced the human population to 10,000 or even 1,000 breeding pairs, creating a bottleneck in human evolution, and killed three-quarters of all plant life in the northern hemisphere. However, there is considerable debate regarding the veracity of this theory. The main danger from a supervolcano is the immense cloud of ash, which has a disastrous global effect on climate and temperature for many years.

Disasters caused by water hazards 

A hydrological disaster is a violent, sudden and destructive change either in the quality of Earth's water or in the distribution or movement of water on land below the surface or in the atmosphere.

Floods

A flood is an overflow of water that 'submerges' land. The EU Floods Directive defines a flood as a temporary covering of land that is usually dry with water. In the sense of 'flowing water', the word may also be applied to the inflow of the tides. Flooding may result from the volume of a body of water, such as a river or lake, becoming higher than usual, causing some of the water to escape its usual boundaries. While the size of a lake or other body of water will vary with seasonal changes in precipitation and snow melt, a flood is not considered significant unless the water covers land used by humans, such as a village, city or other inhabited area, roads or expanses of farmland.

Tsunami

A tsunami (plural: tsunamis or tsunami; from Japanese: 津波, lit. "harbour wave"; English pronunciation: /tsuːˈnɑːmi/), also known as a seismic sea wave or tidal wave, is a series of waves in a water body caused by the displacement of a large volume of water, generally in an ocean or a large lake. Tsunamis can be caused by undersea earthquakes such as the 2004 Boxing Day tsunami, or by landslides such as the one in 1958 at Lituya Bay, Alaska, or by volcanic eruptions such as the ancient eruption of Santorini. On March 11, 2011, a tsunami occurred near Fukushima, Japan and spread through the Pacific Ocean.

Limnic eruptions

A limnic eruption, also known as a lake overturn, occurs when a gas, usually CO2, suddenly erupts from deep lake water, posing the threat of suffocating wildlife, livestock and humans. Such an eruption may also cause tsunamis in the lake as the rising gas displaces water. Scientists believe that landslides, explosions or volcanic activity can trigger such an eruption. To date, only two limnic eruptions have been observed and recorded. In 1984, in Cameroon, a limnic eruption in Lake Monoun caused the deaths of 37 nearby residents; at nearby Lake Nyos in 1986, a much larger eruption killed between 1,700 and 1,800 people by asphyxiation.

Disasters caused by extreme weather hazards

Hot and dry conditions

Heat waves 

A heat wave is a period of unusually and excessively hot weather. The worst heat wave in recent history was the European Heat Wave of 2003. A summer heat wave in Victoria, Australia, created conditions which fuelled the massive bushfires in 2009. Melbourne experienced three days in a row of temperatures exceeding 40 °C (104 °F), with some regional areas sweltering through much higher temperatures. The bushfires, collectively known as "Black Saturday", were partly the act of arsonists. The 2010 Northern Hemisphere summer resulted in severe heat waves which killed over 2,000 people. The heat caused hundreds of wildfires which led to widespread air pollution and burned thousands of square kilometers of forest.

Droughts 

Drought is the unusual dryness of soil caused by levels of rainfall significantly below average over a prolonged period. Hot and dry winds, shortage of water, high temperatures and consequent evaporation of moisture from the ground can also contribute to conditions of drought. Droughts result in crop failure and shortages of water.

Well-known historical droughts include the 1997–2009 Millennium Drought in Australia which led to a water supply crisis across much of the country. As a result, many desalination plants were built for the first time (see list). In 2011, the State of Texas lived under a drought emergency declaration for the entire calendar year and suffered severe economic losses. The drought caused the Bastrop fires.

Duststorms

Firestorms

Wildfires 

Wildfires are large fires which often start in wildland areas. Common causes include lightning and drought but wildfires may also be started by human negligence or arson. They can spread to populated areas and thus be a threat to humans and property, as well as wildlife. Notable wildfires include the 1871 Peshtigo Fire in the United States, which killed at least 1700 people, and the 2009 Victorian bushfires in Australia.

Storms

Tropical cyclone 

Typhoon, cyclone, cyclonic storm and hurricane are different names for the same phenomenon: a tropical storm that forms over an ocean. It is characterized by strong winds, heavy rainfall and thunderstorms. The determining factor on which term is used is based on where the storm originates. In the Atlantic and Northeast Pacific, the term "hurricane" is used; in the Northwest Pacific, it is referred to as a "typhoon"; a "cyclone" occurs in the South Pacific and Indian Ocean.

The deadliest hurricane ever was the 1970 Bhola cyclone; the deadliest Atlantic hurricane was the Great Hurricane of 1780, which devastated Martinique, St. Eustatius and Barbados. Another notable hurricane is Hurricane Katrina, which devastated the Gulf Coast of the United States in 2005. Hurricanes may become more intense and produce more heavy rainfall as a consequence of human-induced climate change.

Thunderstorms 

Severe storms, dust clouds and volcanic eruptions can generate lightning. Apart from the damage typically associated with storms, such as winds, hail and flooding, the lightning itself can damage buildings, ignite fires and kill by direct contact. Especially deadly lightning incidents include a 2007 strike in Ushari Dara, a remote mountain village in northwestern Pakistan, that killed 30 people; the crash of LANSA Flight 508 which killed 91 people; and a fuel explosion in Dronka, Egypt, caused by lightning in 1994 which killed 469 people. Most deaths from lightning occur in the poorer countries of the Americas and Asia, where lightning is common and adobe mud brick housing provides little protection.

Tornadoes 

A tornado is a violent and dangerous rotating column of air that is in contact with both the surface of the Earth and a cumulonimbus cloud, or, in rare cases, the base of a cumulus cloud. It is also referred to as a twister or a cyclone, although the word cyclone is used in meteorology in a wider sense to refer to any closed low pressure circulation. Tornadoes come in many shapes and sizes but typically take the form of a visible condensation funnel, the narrow end of which touches the Earth and is often encircled by a cloud of debris and dust.

Cold-weather events

Blizzards 

Blizzards are severe winter storms characterized by heavy snow and strong winds. When high winds stir up snow that has already fallen, it is known as a ground blizzard. Blizzards can impact local economic activities, especially in regions where snowfall is rare. The Great Blizzard of 1888 affected the United States, when many tons of wheat crops were destroyed. In Asia, the 1972 Iran blizzard and the 2008 Afghanistan blizzard, were the deadliest blizzards in history; in the former, an area the size of Wisconsin was entirely buried in snow. The 1993 Superstorm originated in the Gulf of Mexico and traveled north, causing damage in 26 American states as well as in Canada and leading to more than 300 deaths.

Hailstorms 

Hail is precipitation in the form of ice that does not melt before it hits the ground. A particularly damaging hailstorm hit Munich, Germany, on July 12, 1984, causing about $2 billion in insurance claims.

Ice storms 

An ice storm is a type of winter storm characterized by freezing rain. The U.S. National Weather Service defines an ice storm as a storm which results in the accumulation of at least  of ice on exposed surfaces.

Cold waves 

A cold wave, known in some regions as a cold snap or cold spell, is a weather phenomenon that is distinguished by a cooling of the air. Specifically, as used by the U.S. National Weather Service, a cold wave is a rapid fall in temperature within a 24-hour period, requiring substantially increased protection to agriculture, industry, commerce and social activities. The precise criterion for a cold wave is determined by the rate at which the temperature falls and the minimum to which it falls. This minimum temperature is dependent on the geographical region and time of year.

See also

 Act of God
 Civil defense
 Environmental disaster
 Environmental emergency
 List of environmental disasters
 Urban Search and Rescue
 World Conference on Disaster Risk Reduction
 Wild animal suffering

References

External links